Michael Sean McClain (born September 13, 1975) is an American foil fencer who attended Stanford University in the 1990s.

He moved out of his home in Round Rock, Texas, at the age of 14 to train in New York to pursue his dreams.

He fenced for Stanford University in the 1990s and is one of only two fencers to win a USFA Division I National Championship title in two weapons in recent history.

He was a fencing coach at the Fencing Academy of Westchester, and is now coaching at Empire United Fencing, in New York City, which he founded along with 2004 Olympian Jed Dupree.

Accomplishments 
1994 U.S. Men's Épée Champion
1995 NCAA Division I Men's Foil Champion
1995 Pan-Am Games Silver Medal, Men's Foil
2001 US Men's Foil Champion

See also 
 Fencing
 List of American foil fencers
 USFA

References

American male foil fencers
1975 births
Living people
Pan American Games medalists in fencing
Pan American Games silver medalists for the United States
Fencers at the 1995 Pan American Games